Asphalt Warriors aka The Syringe (original title: L'Arbalète ("the crossbow")) is a French action movie made by Sergio Gobbi in 1984. It stars Daniel Auteuil as the main character.

The plot is about fights between ethnic gangs in Paris.

References

External links

 Short review on bad movie website

1984 films
1980s crime thriller films
French crime thriller films
French neo-noir films
Films directed by Sergio Gobbi
1980s French films